Sergio Camus Perojo (born 19 April 1997) is a Spanish footballer who plays for Atlético Madrid B.

Early career
He played his youth football in the  Racing Santander youth system.

Career
In 2015 and 2016, he split time between the Racing Santander first team in the Segunda División B and the second team in the Tercera División,

In January 2017, he went on loan to Arenas Getxo in the Segunda División B until the end of June 2017.

In August 2017, with playing opportunities with the first team limited, he mutually terminated his contract with Racing Santander and re-joined Arenas de Getxo on a permanent contract.

In January 2018, he was signed by SD Eibar to play for their subsidiary team CD Vitoria in the Segunda División B, with opportunities to train with Eibar.

In August 2020, he signed with Portugalete, returning to the Segunda División B, after spending the previous season in the Tercera División after Vitoria was relegated.

In January 2021, he signed with Atlético Madrid B, staying in the Segunda División B. He made his debut on 31 January against Atlético Baleares. During his time with Atletico Madrid B, he captained the side. He trained with the Atlético Madrid first team during the 2021-22 pre-season, playing five friendly matches, including scoring the winning penalty kick in a match against Numancia. He was an unused substitute for the first team in a UEFA Champions League match against AC Milan.

In August 2022, he joined Atlético Madrid's Canadian Premier League affiliate Atlético Ottawa on loan. This marked his first playing experience outside of Spain. He made his debut on 21 August, coming on as a substitute against Cavalry FC. He helped Ottawa win the regular season title in 2022.

Honours

Atlético Ottawa 
 Canadian Premier League
Regular Season: 2022

References

External links

Sergio Camus at La Preferente

1997 births
Living people
Spanish footballers
Association football defenders
Racing de Santander players
Rayo Cantabria players
Segunda División B players
Tercera Federación players
Tercera División players
Arenas Club de Getxo footballers
CD Vitoria footballers
Club Portugalete players
Atlético Madrid B players
Atlético Ottawa players
Canadian Premier League players